Euphaedra amieti is a butterfly in the family Nymphalidae. It is found in Cameroon.

References

Butterflies described in 1993
amieti
Endemic fauna of Cameroon
Butterflies of Africa